Robert J. Karabinchak is an American Democratic Party politician, who serves in the New Jersey General Assembly, where he represents the 18th Legislative District.

New Jersey Assembly 
Karabinchak previously served on the Edison Municipal Council in 2007 and again from 2009 until being sworn into the General Assembly on May 26, 2016 to fill the unexpired term of Senator Patrick J. Diegnan. Diegnan replaced Senator Peter J. Barnes III upon his appointment to the New Jersey Superior Court.

Committees 
Commerce and Economic Development
Higher Education
Transportation and Independent Authorities
ANR

District 18 
Each of the 40 districts in the New Jersey Legislature has one representative in the New Jersey Senate and two members in the New Jersey General Assembly. The representatives from the 18th District for the 2022—23 Legislative Session are:
 Senator Patrick J. Diegnan (D)
 Assemblyman Robert Karabinchak (D)
 Assemblyman Sterley Stanley (D)

Electoral history

New Jersey Assembly

References

External links
Legislative Webpage
https://www.tapinto.net/towns/edison/articles/edison-democrats-endorse-robert-karabinchak-for-1

Living people
Democratic Party members of the New Jersey General Assembly
People from Edison, New Jersey
21st-century American politicians
1956 births